Deep Rising is a 1998 American action  horror film written and directed by Stephen Sommers and starring Treat Williams, Famke Janssen and Anthony Heald. It was distributed by Hollywood Pictures and Cinergi Pictures and released on February 2, 1998. While the film was a critical and box office failure, it has been regarded as a cult classic.

Plot
Amidst a storm, Captain John Finnegan and his crew, Joey Pantucci, and Leila are hired by mercenaries Hanover, Mulligan, Mason, Billy, T-Ray, Mamooli, and Vivo to pilot their boat across the South China Sea to an undisclosed rendezvous point. Meanwhile, the Argonautica, a luxury cruise ship built and owned by Simon Canton, is undertaking its maiden voyage when a saboteur disables the ship's navigation and communication systems. A large object rises from beneath and rams the vessel, leaving it dead in the water, and the panicking passengers are attacked and slaughtered by unseen creatures.

Finnegan's boat collides with a speedboat shaken loose from the Argonautica during the collision, prompting Finnegan to exasperatedly ask "Now what?" (a catchphrase Finnegan repeats throughout the whole film). It is at this point that the mercenaries take over and reveal they intend to rob the Argonautica'''s passengers and vault, before sinking the ship with torpedoes stowed aboard the boat. The group boards the ship, leaving Leila and Billy behind to repair the boat, where they are both killed by the creatures. The group reaches the ballroom only to find blood and no sign of the passengers. Finnegan and Joey go to the ship's workshop to scavenge parts to repair the boat. Meanwhile, T-Ray goes off to investigate strange noises and is torn to shreds by the creatures. Mamooli contacts Hanover but is dragged off by the unseen creatures, forcing Finnegan and Joey to flee. They run into a woman named Trillian, a passenger who was imprisoned for stealing. Meanwhile, Hanover's group reaches the vault and Vivo opens it, only to be mistakenly killed by Canton, who was hiding inside the vault along with Captain Atherton and three other passengers. Mason and Mulligan panic and accidentally kill the passengers.

Canton and Atherton explain to the mercenaries that the ship has been attacked by unknown creatures that killed everyone else on board. Under questioning, Canton is found to be the saboteur, having hired the mercenaries to sink the unprofitable ship so that he could collect on the insurance. The group is attacked by creatures resembling giant spike-covered tentacles, which eat Atherton. Canton theorizes that the creatures are an extreme evolution of the Ottoia, which drain their victims of their bodily fluids and then eject the carcasses. The survivors flee, but Mason is grabbed by a creature and kills himself by detonating a grenade. Mulligan elects to stay behind in the crew's galley until a rescue party can arrive. While arguing with the others, a creature slips in through the range hood; Mulligan scares it off but is ambushed and devoured by another.

In a running battle, the survivors find themselves being herded towards the bow of the ship, where they find a "feeding ground" full of bloody skeletal remains. Attempting to rid himself of any witnesses to his insurance scam, Canton misleads the others to the bow while he moves towards an exit route. The creatures break through the hull, flooding the lower decks and separating the survivors. Hanover wounds Joey in an attempt to slow the creatures, but Joey escapes. Joey later finds Hanover being devoured by one of the creatures. As an act of mercy, he leaves Hanover a gun, but Hanover wastes his only shot trying to kill Joey and is consumed.

Finnegan and Trillian spot an island and return to Finnegan's boat, but—having lost the engine parts—find it useless as a means of escape. Joey returns and begins improvised repairs, and Finnegan sets the boat's autopilot to crash into the Argonautica and detonate the torpedoes. Trillian returns to the cruise ship and locates a jet ski with the fuel they can use to reach the island, but Canton arrives armed with a flare gun. Canton asks Trillian to join him or hand over the keys, but she flees and he chases her. Finnegan pursues Canton to the ballroom on the main deck, saving Trillian. The creatures smash through the main deck and are revealed to be tentacles of a vast deep-sea monster—the Octalus—rather than individual entities. The Octalus grabs hold of Finnegan, who shoots it in the eye, blinding it and freeing himself, and he and Trillian escape on a jet ski. Canton flees the Argonautica by jumping onto Finnegan's boat, but he breaks his leg doing so. Crippled, he is unable to disable the autopilot and dies as the boat crashes into the Argonautica, detonating the missiles and destroying both ships and the Octalus.

Finnegan and Trillian reach the island, where they find and reunite with Joey, whom they thought had died. As the three are catching their breath, a loud roar echoes from the jungle; the camera pulls back, revealing the island to have an active volcano in the distance as something big comes crashing through the trees towards the beach. Finnegan is then heard asking "Now what?" one last time.

Cast

Production

Stephen Sommers began writing the script to Deep Rising, then called Tentacle, when he worked at Hollywood Pictures in the mid-1990s. Claire Forlani was originally cast as Trillian St. James, but dropped out after just three days, due to creative differences with Sommers, and Famke Janssen was subsequently cast. Janssen almost did not get the part because the producers felt she was too recognizable from GoldenEye, but they relented. Harrison Ford turned down the role of John Finnegan, which later went to Treat Williams, and the film's budget was later downsized.

Filming for Deep Rising began on June 12, 1996, and lasted until October 18 of that year. The film was originally set for release in the fall of 1997, but was delayed until the following February 1998. Industrial Light and Magic was responsible for the film's special effects while Rob Bottin who had previously worked on The Thing and on Paul Verhoven's RoboCop was hired as the special makeup effects designer.

The exterior shots of the cruise ship Argonautica was created by CGI, and is an original design not based on any existing vessel. Two models of the cruise ship were created, a  model for shots of the Argonautica on the ocean, and a  model for the sinking of Argonautica.

Release
On its opening weekend the film made $4,737,793 (42% of its total gross), ranking #8. It ended with a total intake of $11.2 million.

Reception
Rotten Tomatoes gives the film a score of 32%, with an average rating of 4.2 out of 10, based on 34 reviews. The website's "Critics Consensus" for the film reads, "Its fleeting glimpses of creature feature mayhem are certainly dumb fun, but Deep Rising cribs from far too many better movies to stand on its own." Chicago Sun-Times critic Roger Ebert included the film in his most hated list. Ebert called the film "essentially an Alien clone with a fresh paint job". Variety Leonard Klady said the film "is an old-fashioned B-movie with A-budget effects, but the quality sheen can't disguise the cheap-thrills hokum."

Ty Burr, writing for Entertainment Weekly called the film "a tightly written, often howlingly funny Aliens knockoff that, in its portrayal of tough men and tougher women under pressure, favorably recalls the work of Howard Hawks", giving it a grade of "B−". Bloody Disgusting wrote, "Excellent cast, State-of-art special effects, and terrific acting, this is a movie that should not be missed."

Audiences polled by CinemaScore gave the film an average grade of "C+" on an A+ to F scale.

It has gone on to become a cult classic. Later Director Stephen Sommers said: "It didn’t do a ton of business, but it has a very fervent following."

Home mediaDeep Rising was released on DVD and VHS on October 19, 1998, both of which are now out of print. It was released 2-Disc Special Edition on DVD and Blu-ray on May 29, 2007. It was released on Blu-ray as a double feature with The Puppet Masters'' from Mill Creek Entertainment on October 9, 2012. Kino Lorber re-released the film on DVD and Blu-ray with new special features on August 21, 2018.

References

External links

 
 
 
 Original draft
 Review by Scifi.com
 Japanese poster
 Stomp Tokyo review

1990s science fiction horror films
American action horror films
American survival films
Cinergi Pictures films
Films scored by Jerry Goldsmith
Films directed by Stephen Sommers
Films produced by Laurence Mark
Films set on cruise ships
Hollywood Pictures films
Films about ship hijackings
Seafaring films
1990s English-language films
1990s American films